Hack and Simon Office Building, also known as the Eagle Brewery Office Building, is a historic office building located at Vincennes, Knox County, Indiana.  It was built in 1885, and is a two-story, Romanesque Revival style red brick building, with a -story rear addition built about 1910.  It rests on a limestone foundation and has gable roofs on the two sections.  The front facade features arched openings and raised carving of the Eagle Brewery emblem. The building housed brewery and later distillery offices into the 1950s, after which it was acquired by Vincennes University.

It was added to the National Register of Historic Places in 2003.

References

Vincennes, Indiana
Commercial buildings on the National Register of Historic Places in Indiana
Romanesque Revival architecture in Indiana
Commercial buildings completed in 1885
Buildings and structures in Knox County, Indiana
National Register of Historic Places in Knox County, Indiana